The 2021–22 Botswana Premier League was the 56th season of the Botswana Premier League, the top-tier football league in Botswana, since its establishment in 1966. The season started on 31 October 2020. Following their title, Gaborone United earned a P3 million sponsorship deal from Bank Gaborone.

League table

Stadiums

References

Botswana Premier League
Botswana
2021 in Botswana sport
2022 in Botswana sport